Pterostylis aspera, commonly known as the rough shell orchid, is a species of orchid endemic to the south-west of Western Australia. As with similar greenhoods, the flowering plants differ from those which are not flowering. The non-flowering plants have a rosette of leaves flat on the ground but the flowering plants have a single flower with leaves on the flowering spike. In this common species, the flower is white with green and reddish-brown stripes and a short, straight labellum.

Description
Pterostylis aspera is a terrestrial, perennial, deciduous, herb with an underground tuber and when not flowering, a rosette of bluish-green leaves lying flat on the ground. The flowers are white with green and reddish-brown stripes. The dorsal sepal and petals are fused, forming a hood or "galea" over the column and the dorsal sepal has a sharp point. Flowering occurs from May to July.

Taxonomy and naming
Pterostylis aspera was first formally described in 1989 by David Jones and Mark Clements from a specimen collected near Eaton and the description was published in Australian Orchid Research. The specific epithet (aspera) is a Latin word meaning "rough", "harsh" or "uneven", referring to hairs on the labellum.

Distribution and habitat
The rough shell orchid grows in shrubland and woodland between Dongara and Jerramungup in the Avon Wheatbelt, Esperance Plains, Jarrah Forest, Mallee and Swan Coastal Plain biogeographic regions.

Conservation
Pterostylis aspera is listed as "not threatened" by the Government of Western Australia Department of Parks and Wildlife.

References

aspera
Endemic orchids of Australia
Orchids of Western Australia
Plants described in 1989